Didier Ollé-Nicolle (born 2 September 1961) is French football manager and former player who played as a defender. He recently managed Division 1 Féminine side Paris Saint-Germain Féminine.

Club career
Ollé-Nicolle was born in Belley, Ain. He had a modest playing career in French lower leagues for Angers, Chambéry and Raon-l'Étape. His demarcation was defender.

Managerial career
Ollé-Nicolle coached Raon-l'Étape, Valenciennes, Nîmes, Châteauroux. He has managing in Ligue 1 at OGC Nice, as of 1 July 2009 and on 9 March 2010, Nice decided to sack him and put the team into the hands of Eric Roy, René Marsiglia and Frédéric Gioria.

In September 2010, he was named Neuchâtel Xamax manager. He was sacked after a 4–1 home defeat against FC Thun on 11 May 2011, leaving the Swiss Cup finalist two points clear of relegation with three games left.

In July 2011, he was hired as manager for Apollon Limassol, a Cypriot team considered to be one of the strong teams on the island of Cyprus, with lot of supporters but with many economic and staffing issues surrounding the team in 2011. Didier Nicolle appeared to be the most appropriate manager after short-listing some others, to help the team regain its prestige and return to the path of titles and glory.

On 10 November 2011, Ollé-Nicolle was appointed as manager of Algerian Ligue Professionnelle 1 side USM Alger, signing a two-year contract with the club.

On 24 May 2012, it was confirmed Ollé-Nicolle would take charge as the coach of Championnat National side FC Rouen for the 2012–13 season.

In March 2014, Ollé-Nicolle was named the head coach of the Benin national team on a two-year contract. He departed the role in November 2014.

In March 2015, he was named as head coach of SR Colmar in the third tier of French football.

In 2016, he became the new manager of US Orléans. In February 2020, with the club at the bottom of the Ligue 2 table, he was sacked.

On 1 June 2020 he was announced as the new head coach of Le Mans FC. After finishing 4th in the 2020–21 Championnat National, it was announced that he was leaving his position.

References

External links

1961 births
Living people
People from Belley
Association football defenders
French footballers
Angers SCO players
US Raon-l'Étape players
Ligue 2 players
French expatriate sportspeople in Algeria
French expatriate sportspeople in Switzerland
French football managers
US Raon-l'Étape managers
Valenciennes FC managers
Nîmes Olympique managers
LB Châteauroux managers
Clermont Foot managers
OGC Nice managers
Ligue 1 managers
Ligue 2 managers
Neuchâtel Xamax FCS managers
French expatriate football managers
Expatriate football managers in Switzerland
Apollon Limassol FC managers
Expatriate football managers in Cyprus
USM Alger managers
Expatriate football managers in Algeria
FC Rouen managers
US Orléans managers
Le Mans FC managers
Paris Saint-Germain Féminine managers
Benin national football team managers
Expatriate football managers in Benin
Sportspeople from Ain
Chambéry SF players
French expatriate sportspeople in Benin
French expatriate sportspeople in Cyprus
Footballers from Auvergne-Rhône-Alpes